Daniel Aloysius Maher (October 29, 1881 – November 9, 1916) was an American Hall of Fame jockey who also became a Champion jockey in Great Britain.

U.S. riding career 
Danny Maher commenced his career at the age of 14, weighing 65 pounds. He served his apprenticeship under "Father" Bill Daly, a well known developer of jockey talent. Three years later, in 1898, he topped America's jockey's list.  Maher was best known in the United States for winning the Metropolitan Handicap on Ethelbert (1900), the Brooklyn Handicap and Toboggan Handicap on Banaster (1899), the Champagne Stakes on Lothario (1898), and the Ladies Handicap on Oneck Queen (1900). Danny Maher was America's leading jockey in 1898.

The Hart–Agnew Law anti-gambling legislation forced Maher and numerous other jockeys and trainers to leave America for Europe where they quickly made a mark on European racing.

English riding career 

In England, Maher won 1,421 races with 25 percent of his mounts. He won his first English Classic on Aida in the 1901 1,000 Guineas and later that year won the Chester Cup on the colt David Garrick, owned by American Pierre Lorillard IV. In 1903, Maher won two-thirds of England's Triple Crown with Rock Sand. He also won The Derby three times (1903, 1905, 1906), five Eclipse Stakes (1902, 1904, 1906, 1909, 1910), and was a two-time winner of the Ascot Gold Cup (1906, 1909). In 1907 Maher's wins included the King's Gold Vase.

He was Britain's leading jockey in 1908 and 1913, the year he obtained British citizenship.

Maher died at the age of 35 of consumption. He is buried in Paddington Cemetery, Mill Hill, London, England.

In 1955, Maher was one of the inaugural inductees in the United States' Racing Hall of Fame. In 1999, the Racing Post ranked Maher as third in their list of the Top 50 jockeys of the 20th century.

Career at a glance 
U.S. riding career: 1895–1900
Number of Mounts: 6,781
Number of Winners: 1,771
Winning percentage: 26.1 percent

British riding career: 1900–1915
Number of Mounts: 5,684 est.
Number of Winners: 1,421
Winning percentage: 25 percent

External sources 
 Eclipse Stakes winners

References

1881 births
1916 deaths
American jockeys
British jockeys
Sportspeople from Hartford, Connecticut
United States Thoroughbred Racing Hall of Fame inductees
Jewish American sportspeople
20th-century deaths from tuberculosis
British Champion flat jockeys
Sportspeople from Connecticut
Tuberculosis deaths in England
American expatriate sportspeople in England
Burials at Paddington Old Cemetery